Wiesław Kielar (12 August 1919 – 1 June 1990) was a Polish author, filmmaker, and prisoner in the concentration camp Auschwitz.

Kielar was arrested at the beginning of 1940 in Jarosław and was one of the first prisoners of concentration camp Auschwitz (identification number 290). He spent almost five years in different parts of the complex. He held various positions, including nurse, writer and "prison senior". After the Second World War he went to the National Film School in Łódź and worked as a filmmaker. About his stay in Auschwitz, he wrote the book  Anus Mundi: 1,500 Days in Auschwitz/Birkenau. 

References

External links
 Photo of Wiesław Kielar (from the Auschwitz page of Muzeum-Jaroslaw.pl)

1919 births
1990 deaths
Auschwitz concentration camp survivors
Polish filmmakers
20th-century Polish writers
20th-century male writers